"Marea (We've Lost Dancing)" is a song by Fred Again and the Blessed Madonna, released on 22 February 2021 through Again. and Atlantic UK.

Background and release
The song was created by Fred Again following a conversation with the Blessed Madonna. The lyrics were created by sampling the Blessed Madonna's speech. It was released on Atlantic Records on 22 February 2021.

In March 2021, Fred Again announced his debut solo album, Actual Life (April 14 – December 17 2020), which includes this song.

Lyrics and composition
The song describes the loss of dancing and clubbing during the COVID-19 pandemic, but also looks forward to its return.

Remix
In June 2021, the song was remixed by Diplo.

Charts

Weekly charts

Year-end charts

Certifications

Other media 
The song is featured in the 2022 satirical black comedy film Triangle of Sadness by Ruben Östlund.

References

2021 songs
2021 singles
Fred Again songs
The Blessed Madonna songs
Atlantic Records UK singles
Songs about the COVID-19 pandemic
Song recordings produced by Fred Again
Songs written by Fred Again
Songs written by the Blessed Madonna